The 1927 Southern Conference men's basketball tournament took place from February 25–March 1, 1927, at Municipal Auditorium in Atlanta, Georgia. The Vanderbilt Commodores won their first Southern Conference title, led by head coach Josh Cody.

Bracket

* Overtime game

Championship

All-Southern tournament team

See also
List of Southern Conference men's basketball champions

References

Tournament
Southern Conference men's basketball tournament
Southern Conference men's basketball tournament
Southern Conference men's basketball tournament
Southern Conference men's basketball tournament